The 2011 Copa Perú season, the promotion tournament of Peruvian football, started on February.

The tournament has 5 stages. The first four stages are played as mini-league round-robin tournaments, except for third stage in region IV, which is played as a knockout stage. The final stage features two knockout rounds and a final four-team group stage to determine the two promoted teams. 

The 2011 Peru Cup started with the District Stage on February.  The next stage was the Provincial Stage which started on June. The tournament continued with the Departamental Stage on July. The Regional Stage follow in September. The National Stage starts in November. The winner of the National Stage will be promoted to the First Division and the runner-up will be promoted to the Second Division.

Departmental Stage
Departmental Stage: 2011 Ligas Departamentales del Peru and 2011 Ligas Superiores del Peru

The following list shows the teams that qualified for the Regional Stage.

Regional Stage
Each region had two teams qualify for the next stage. The playoffs only determined the respective regional winners.

Region I
Region I includes qualified teams from Amazonas, Lambayeque, Tumbes and Piura region.

First stage

Second stage

Semifinals

Final

Region II
Region II includes qualified teams from Ancash, Cajamarca, La Libertad and San Martín region.

Group A

Group B

Group C

Semifinals

Region III
Region III includes qualified teams from Loreto and Ucayali region.

Group A

Tiebreaker

Group B

Final

Region IV
Region IV includes qualified teams from Lima and Callao region.

First stage

Semifinals

Final

Region V
Region V includes qualified teams from Junín, Pasco and Huánuco region.

Group A

Group B

Final

Region VI
Region VI includes qualified teams from Ayacucho, Huancavelica and Ica region. Two teams qualified from this stage.

Group A

Group B

Final

Region VII
Region VII includes qualified teams from Arequipa, Moquegua and Tacna region.

Group A

Group B

Semifinals

Final

Region VIII
Region VIII includes qualified teams from Apurimac, Cusco, Madre de Dios and Puno region.

Group A

Group B

Tiebreaker

National Stage
The National Stage starts on November. This stage has two knockout rounds and four-team group stage. The winner will be promoted to the 2012 Torneo Descentralizado and the runner-up of the National Stage will be promoted to the 2012 Peruvian Segunda División.

Round of 16

Quarterfinals

Semifinals

Finals

Notes

External links
  Copa Peru 2011
  Semanario Pasión

2011
2011 domestic association football cups
2011 in Peruvian football